Flore was a 44-gun or 40-gun  of the French Navy.

Service history
In 1808, she was part of Ganteaume's  squadron that cruised in the Mediterranean.

On 12 March 1811, she was part of Bernard Dubourdieu's squadron sailing to raid the British commerce raider base of the island of Lissa. The squadron encountered William Hoste's frigate squadron, leading to the Battle of Lissa.

In the ensuing fight, Flore was distanced by her flagship , which engaged the British flagship , and ran aground. Flore and Bellona caught on and engaged Amphion in a crossfire.  Amphion outmanoeuvred Flore and raked her for ten minutes, after which Flore struck her colours.

Flore was wrecked in a tempest off Chioggia on 30 November 1811, with the loss of 75. Her commanding officer, Frigate Captain Lissilour, was acquitted by the court martial.

A  shipyard model of Flore, originally part of the Trianon model collection, is on display at the Musée national de la Marine in Paris.

References

Bibliography

Age of Sail frigates of France
Shipwrecks in the Adriatic Sea
Maritime incidents in 1811
1806 ships
Armide-class frigates
Ships built in France